HMS Thistle was a 12-gun  built by Mary Ross at Rochester, Kent. She was launched in 1812 and broken up at Portsmouth in July 1823.

Design and construction
The Bold class were a revival of Sir William Rule's  design of 1804.  They were armed with ten 18-pounder carronades and two 6-pounder bow chasers. Built at Rochester, Kent by Mary Ross, Bold was launched on 13 July 1812 and commissioned on 12 September 1812 under Commander James K White.

Service
In early January 1814 during the War of 1812, some crew volunteered to reinforce the squadron on the Great Lakes, together with men from Fantome and Manly. Seventy men left Halifax; they reached Kingston, Ontario on 22 March, having traveled some 900 miles in winter, almost entirely on foot. Mathew Abdy, Master of Thistle was one such volunteer, but he died of exposure in Woodstock, New Brunswick in February 1814. She was subsequently commanded by Lieutenant I. Burch during the operations in the Chesapeake, and was present during the actions at Washington and Baltimore. She was subsequently captained by Commander James Montague in autumn 1814.

Under the rules of prize-money, Herald shared in the proceeds of the capture of six American vessels in the Battle of Lake Borgne on 14 December 1814. After the Battle of Lake Borgne,  with Thistle, Herald, Pigmy and two bomb vessels,  went up the Mississippi River to create a diversion. These latter five ships were to take part in the Siege of Fort St. Philip (1815). She returned to Great Britain after the end of the War of 1812, and was paid off on 7 August 1815.

Thistle was recommissioned in May 1819, and was commanded by Lieutenant Robert Hagan, and deployed to the African station, under whose command he captured 40 sail of vessels and liberated 4000 slaves. She was broken up at Portsmouth in July 1823.

Footnotes
Notes

Citations

References

 Fraser, Edward, & L. G. Carr-Laughton (1930). The Royal Marine Artillery 1804-1923, Volume 1 [1804-1859]. London: The Royal United Services Institution. 
Parkinson, C. Northcote, & Charles Ernest Fayle, eds. (2006). The Trade Winds: A Study of British Overseas Trade During the French Wars .... (London: Taylor & Francis)
 Snider, C.H.J. (1928) Under the Red Jack; Privateers of the Maritime Provinces of Canada in the War of 1812. (London: Martin Hopkinson & Co.)

Brigs of the Royal Navy
1812 ships
Ships built in Kent
War of 1812 ships of the United Kingdom